Hickory High School (Hickory, Virginia) is a high school in Chesapeake, Virginia. There are approximately 2,100 students. The mascot is a hawk and the school colors are teal, grey, white, and black.

Owing to the overwhelming number of students, a new school, Grassfield High School, was built nearby.

Extracurriculars
Hickory High School activities include:
Cheerleading - 2004-2005 District and Regional Champions, 2005-2006 District and Regional Champions, 5th in State, 2007-2008 2nd in state, State 5A Champion 2014.
Scholastic Bowl - 2008 District and Regional Champions, 2010/2011 District Champs
Marching band - USSBA State Champions and Mid Atlantic Champions
Winter Guard - AIA Finalists 3 years running
Winter Percussion - WGI Champions 2012
Chamber orchestra - Under the direction of Steve Campbell
Dance team
Robotics - 2009 Rookie All-Star and 2011 Team Spirit Award at VCU Regional, 2019 Team Spirit Award at Portsmouth and 2019 Imagery Award at Blacksburg, 2018 Gracious Professionalism award at Hampton Roads and Southeast Virginia events.

The 2007-2008 Scholastic Bowl Team won the titles of Southeastern District Champions and Southeastern District Season Champions and Eastern Region Champions, and finished the season with a 21-3 record, coming in third place in the 2008 state championship. The team also came in third in the 2009 season, finishing with a 20-4 record.

In 2011, Hickory's Technology Student Association team placed 4th at the National TSA conference in Digital Video Production.

Band and Marching Band

In 2011, the Marching Hawks placed second in the Bands of America Towson Regional Championship and then placed eighth in finals at the Bands of America Indianapolis Super Regional Championship later that year. The band has consistently made finals in many Bands of America Regional and Super Regional Championships (such as Towson, Delaware, and Indianapolis). The Marching Hawks have been named USSBA Mid Atlantic and State champions.

Hickory's Winter Percussion were the 2012 WGI Scholastic Concert Open Champions, and Hickory's Winter Guard has been AIA finalists multiple times. Hickory's Wind Ensemble participated in the Music for All National Festival in 2014.

Athletics
Hickory High School athletics include:
Football
Golf - seven-time Southeastern Champions
Volleyball
Basketball
Wrestling
Soccer
Track & Field
Swimming
Tennis
Cheerleading - 2004, 2005, 2006 District and Regional Champions (3rd, 5th, and 2nd in State), 2014 State (5A) Champions
Gymnastics
Cross Country- 2012 District and Regional Champions
Baseball - State (5A) Champions 2014
Softball - 2008 Virginia State Champions
Field Hockey
Swim & Dive
Crew
Lacrosse
Led by local Superstar James Bridges

In 2005, Hickory's Men's Soccer team was ranked 2nd nationally going 25-0 before losing to Cox 1-0 in the Regional Semi-Finals.

On June 7, 2008, the Lady Hawks Softball team defeated Battlefield High School 4-2 to win the Virginia State Softball Championship. The first state championship in sports in the school's history.

On October 3, 2008, Hickory's Football Team beat Grassfield High School on homecoming night. At the time, it was ranked tenth in the region. This win was the first under the new direction of Coach Sitterson.

In 2007, Hickory's men's volleyball team was one game away from an appearance in the AAA state tournament losing to First Colonial High 0-3 at regionals.

In 2008, Hickory's lacrosse team was formed. Hickory went 0-10 in its inaugural season, only to go undefeated in regional play the next year.

In 2009, Hickory's men's soccer team advanced to the AAA state semi-finals only to lose 2-1 in the semis.

In 2011, Hickory's scholastic bowl team was 1st in district, 2nd in region, and 3rd in state.

In 2013, Hickorys Cheer Team won the 5A State Championship.

In 2014, Hickory's baseball team won the 5A State Championship, their first in school history.

In 2014, Hickory's Cheer Team won the 5A State Championship, successfully defending their title and it marked the 4th State Championship for the school in its history, and the 3rd in the last year.

Notable alumni
Ciara Sivels, nuclear engineer
Scott Sizemore, professional baseball infielder with the Oakland Athletics of Major League Baseball
David Wright, New York Mets third baseman and seven time Major League All Star

Notes

Public high schools in Virginia
Schools in Chesapeake, Virginia
Educational institutions established in 1996
1996 establishments in Virginia